Sammy Schmitz (born September 7, 1980) is an American amateur golfer who won the 2015 U.S. Mid-Amateur Golf Championship.

College career
Schmitz was an NCAA Division III All-American at Saint John's College.

Pro career
Schmitz briefly competed on the Hooters Tour.

Amateur career
After his brief pro career, Schmitz regained his amateur status and won the 2015 U.S. Mid-Amateur to qualify for the 2016 Masters Tournament where he would shoot 81-75 to miss the cut.

Outside of golf
Schmitz works full-time in the healthcare industry.

Amateur wins
this list is probably incomplete
2016 U.S. Mid-Amateur

References

American male golfers
Amateur golfers
Golfers from Wisconsin
People from River Falls, Wisconsin
1980 births
Living people